Yeskovo is a rural locality in Nozdrachevsky Selsoviet Rural Settlement, Kursky District, Kursk Oblast, Russia. Population:

Geography 
The village is located on the Vinogrobl River (a left tributary of the Tuskar in the basin of the Seym), 109 km from the Russia–Ukraine border, 12 km north-east of the district center – the town Kursk, 2 km from the selsoviet center – Nozdrachevo.

 Climate
Yeskovo has a warm-summer humid continental climate (Dfb in the Köppen climate classification).

Transport 
Yeskovo is located 18 km from the federal route  Crimea Highway (a part of the European route ), 5 km from the road of regional importance  (Kursk – Kastornoye), on the road of intermunicipal significance  (38K-016 – Nozdrachevo – Vinogrobl), 5 km from the nearest railway halt 18 km (railway line Kursk – 146 km).

The rural locality is situated 11 km from Kursk Vostochny Airport, 131 km from Belgorod International Airport and 196 km from Voronezh Peter the Great Airport.

References

Notes

Sources

Rural localities in Kursky District, Kursk Oblast